White Heat is a 1926 British drama film directed by Thomas Bentley and starring Juliette Compton, Wyndham Standing and George Bellamy. The screenplay concerns a dancer who becomes romantically involved with a producer.

Plot summary

Cast
 Juliette Compton – Helen 
 Wyndham Standing – Gilbert Gillman 
 Vesta Sylva – Eve Storer 
 Walter Butler  – Julian Jefferson 
 Bertram Burleigh – Phil Storer 
 George Bellamy – Mr. Storey 
 Wellington Briggs – Hall 
 Estelle Brody – Ninon 
 Alf Goddard – Apache

References

External links
 

1926 films
British silent feature films
1926 drama films
1920s English-language films
Films directed by Thomas Bentley
British drama films
British black-and-white films
Silent drama films
1920s British films